Henry Eustace Guinness (22 September 1897 – 19 February 1972) was an Irish banker and politician. His place of education was at Winchester College, in Hampshire, England. He fought in World War I and gained the rank of Lieutenant in the service of the Royal Artillery. In addition, he was a partner and later of managing director of Guinness & Mahon bank.

He was an independent member of Seanad Éireann from 1954 to 1957. Henry Eustace Guinness was nominated by the Taoiseach, John A. Costello in 1954 to the 8th Seanad. However, he did not contest the 1957 Seanad election.

References

1897 births
1972 deaths
Independent members of Seanad Éireann
Members of the 8th Seanad
Henry Eustace
Irish bankers
People educated at Winchester College
British Army personnel of World War I
Royal Artillery officers
Nominated members of Seanad Éireann